Celaenorrhinus ficulnea, the velvet flat, is a species of butterfly in the family Hesperiidae. It is found in south-east Asia.

The larvae feed on Didissandra (Gesneriaceae) species.

Subspecies
Celaenorrhinus ficulnea ficulnea
Celaenorrhinus ficulnea crona (Hewitson, 1878) - Batchian
Celaenorrhinus ficulnea tola (Hewitson, 1878) - Celebes
Celaenorrhinus ficulnea queda (Plötz, 1885) - Assam, Burma, Thailand, Malay Peninsula, Tioman, Sumatra
Celaenorrhinus ficulnea zawi (Plötz, 1885) - Celebes

References

Butterflies described in 1868
ficulnea
Butterflies of Indochina
Taxa named by William Chapman Hewitson